Raphaelle "Rafy" Veronica Ortega-David (born March 14, 1997) is a Filipino politician who serves as governor of La Union.

Career
Ortega-David became the first female governor of La Union when she won the 2022 gubernatorial election. She succeeded her father Francisco Ortega III for the position. Her father was supposed to launch an reelection bid but withdrew his candidacy. Ortega-David substituted her father's candidacy.

Personal life
She is married to Kevin David.

References

Living people
Governors of La Union